The Paige Compositor was an invention developed by James W. Paige (1842–1917) between 1872 and 1888. It was designed to replace the human typesetter of a lead type-composed printing form with a mechanical arm. In the early 1890s, a group of inventors signed a contract with Towner K. Webster in Chicago to produce 3,000 compositors. However, the machine was not nearly as precise as it should have been and never turned a profit because of its complexity and continual need for adjustment based upon trial and error. As a result, it was the Linotype typesetting machine, which composed in a hot metal typesetting process, that became the new popular typesetting machine.
 
The Paige typesetting machine is notable for substantial investment that the prominent writer Mark Twain made into the failed endeavor: $300,000 ($ today). Twain, a former printer, invested not only the bulk of his book profits but also a large portion of the inheritance of Olivia Clemens, his wife. Many point to his over-investment in the Paige typesetting machine and other inventions as the cause of not only his family's financial decline but also the decline of his wit and humor.

Webster Manufacturing made fewer than six machines costing $15,000 apiece, over three times as much as the initial production estimates.  One was donated by Cornell University for a scrap metal drive during World War II. The only surviving machine is displayed at the Mark Twain House in Hartford, Connecticut.

References

External links
 Page at ERIC
  Precursor by Paige (patent application filed 1872)
  Paige Compositor patent (application filed 1882)

Typesetting